The Bulletin of Hispanic Studies is a peer-reviewed academic journal published by Liverpool University Press for the Department of Modern Languages and Cultures, University of Liverpool. It was founded by Edgar Allison Peers in 1923. It is indexed and abstracted in:
 Arts and Humanities Citation Index
 Current Contents/Arts & Humanities
 Scopus

References 

Latin American studies journals
Hijacked journals
Publications established in 1923
10 times per year journals
Liverpool University Press books